Jimmy & Wes: The Dynamic Duo is a 1966 collaborative album by American jazz guitarist Wes Montgomery and electric organist Jimmy Smith, with arrangements by Oliver Nelson. It is frequently listed among Jimmy Smith's best albums. The duo's follow-up record, Further Adventures of Jimmy and Wes, was recorded during the same sessions and released in 1968.

Reception 

Richard S. Ginell reviewed the album for AllMusic and was highly favorable in his comments, writing:

Track listing
Side One
 "Down by the Riverside" (Traditional) – 10:02
 "Night Train"  (Jimmy Forrest) – 6:46
Side Two
 "James and Wes"  (Jimmy Smith) – 8:13
 "13 (Death March)"  (Gary McFarland) – 5:22
 "Baby, It's Cold Outside"  (Frank Loesser) – 6:05

1997 CD reissue bonus track
 "O.G.D. (aka Road Song)"  (Wes Montgomery) - Alternate Take – 5:13

Personnel

Musicians
Jimmy Smith – Hammond organ
Wes Montgomery – guitar
Grady Tate – drums
Ray Barretto – conga (tracks  3 - 6)
Tracks 1, 2, 4 add:
Bob Ashton, Danny Bank, Jerry Dodgion, Jerome Richardson, Phil Woods – reeds
Clark Terry – trumpet, flugelhorn
Ernie Royal, Jimmy Maxwell, Joe Newman – trumpet
Jimmy Cleveland, Melba Liston, Quentin Jackson – trombone
Tony Studd – bass trombone (tracks 1-2)
Dick Hixson – bass trombone (track 4)
Richard Davis – bass
Oliver Nelson – arranger, conductor

Production 
 Creed Taylor – producer
 Val Valentin – director of engineering
 Rudy Van Gelder – engineer
 Acy R. Lehman – cover design
 Chuck Stewart – photography

Chart performance

Album

References

1966 albums
Wes Montgomery albums
Jimmy Smith (musician) albums
Albums produced by Creed Taylor
Verve Records albums
Albums arranged by Oliver Nelson
Albums conducted by Oliver Nelson
Albums recorded at Van Gelder Studio